Kakloor (Village ID 574717) is a village and panchayat in Ranga Reddy district, AP, India. It falls under Shabad mandal. According to the 2011 census it has a population of 4954 living in 1151 households. Its main agriculture product is maize growing.

Two villages are their under Kakloor village

References

Villages in Ranga Reddy district